George E. Mastics (December 27, 1931 – October 31, 2018) was a member of the Ohio House of Representatives, and a former Port of Palm Beach Commissioner in Palm Beach County, Florida.

References

1931 births
2018 deaths
Republican Party members of the Ohio House of Representatives
Culver Academies alumni